Peter Lupton (born 7 March 1982) is a professional rugby footballer who plays and coaches rugby league for the Boston Thirteens in the North American Rugby League competition.

He earned selection in the Welsh national team after qualifying through 3-years residency, and later captained the team at the 2014 European Cup. Lupton moved to Boston, United States, and played rugby union professionally and rugby league as an amateur. He was named player-coach of the Boston Thirteens for their first season as a semi-professional club in 2021.

Background
Lupton was born in Whitehaven, Cumbria, England.

Career

Rugby league
He has previously played for Workington Town in Championship 1 and Crusaders in the Super League.

Lupton has previously played for the London Broncos, the Leeds Rhinos, and Hull F.C.

Lupton was named in the Welsh squad for the 2011 Four Nations, qualifying on 3-years residency. He made his début in a warm-up match against Ireland, but did not feature in the tournament. Lupton played for Wales at the 2013 World Cup, and captained the side at the 2014 European Cup in the absence of Craig Kopczak.

In March 2015, Lupton signed with the Barrow Raiders

In 2016, Lupton joined the Boston 13s in the USA Rugby League. He was named as coach in 2017, continuing the role in 2021 as the club joined the inaugural North American Rugby League season and turned semi-professional.

Rugby union
In the fall of 2018, Lupton signed with the New England Free Jacks in the MLR.

References

External links
(archived by web.archive.org) Profile at castigers.com
Boston 13s profile
London Broncos profile

1982 births
Living people

Boston Thirteens coaches
Boston 13s players
Castleford Tigers players
Crusaders Rugby League players
English rugby league coaches
English rugby league players
English expatriate rugby union players
English expatriate sportspeople in the United States
Expatriate rugby union players in the United States
Hull F.C. players
London Broncos players
New England Free Jacks players
Rugby league locks
Rugby league second-rows
Rugby league five-eighths
Rugby league halfbacks
Rugby league players from Whitehaven
Wales national rugby league team captains
Wales national rugby league team players
Workington Town players